Rochelle Rodgers (born 15 April 1987) is an Australian athlete. She competed in the women's marathon event at the 2019 World Athletics Championships.

References

External links
 

1987 births
Living people
Australian female long-distance runners
Australian female marathon runners
Place of birth missing (living people)
World Athletics Championships athletes for Australia
20th-century Australian women
21st-century Australian women